Lady Don, born Emilia Eliza "Emily" Saunders (c. 1830 – 29 September 1875) was an English singer and actor who enjoyed great popularity in Australia. She married an actor, Sir William Henry Don, Bart., who died in Hobart, Tasmania on 18 March 1862.

History
The eldest daughter of John Saunders, a London actor, Saunders was attracted to the stage at an early age, becoming popular on account of her beautiful singing voice.

Australia
They proceeded to Australia aboard Blue Jacket, arriving in Melbourne on 16 December 1860, and opened at the Theatre Royal on 21 January 1861 as Josephine in The Daughter of the Regiment (billed as The Child of the Regiment). The operetta was well received, and she was applauded by audience and critics alike, while her husband's eccentric performance in the accompanying farce was greeted enthusiastically. On Burns Night they played Guy Mannering to a crowded house, with Lady Don as Julia Mannering and Sir William as Dandie Dinmont. They left Melbourne at the end of March 1861, playing Sydney April–June, with Geelong, Ballarat and Bendigo and other gold rush towns in July–October. They returned to the Theatre Royal, Melbourne for a second season November 1861 – January 1862. On 24 February they opened at the Theatre Royal, Hobart, and it was at Webb's Hotel, Murray Street in that town that Sir William Don died on 19 March 1862 at age 37. He had been suffering lung problems, but died of an aortic aneurysm, and was buried privately at St David's cemetery in Davey Street. Lady Don fulfilled her immediate obligations but refused offers of further engagements, though they would have been highly lucrative, and left with her daughter for England by the Lincolnshire on 26 May 1862. One of her last acts was to have her husband's coffin exhumed and despatched to London  by the Harrowby, which left Hobart on 1 May 1862.

Return to Australia
In England Lady Don and her daughter lived with Sir William's family, but had no income and was unable by circumstances to appear on stage, so was anxious to return to Australia where she was certain of making a living.

She left in the ship Suffolk, which arrived in Melbourne on 25 May 1864. Her first appearance was on 6 August 1864, at the Haymarket, which reopened under a new lessee, Hoskins. She opened the season by again playing Josephine in The Child of the Regiment to tremendous applause. Seemingly having forgotten his previous antipathy, Howson's troupe supplied support. 
She went on to play Sydney January–March 1865, from which time she was managed by Henry D. Wilton, and her performances were supported by the Howson Family Troupe: Frank, Emma and Clelia. She played Brisbane March–April, Tasmania April–May, Adelaide June–August and Melbourne September–November.
They played Sydney December 1865–January 1866, then across the Tasman Sea to New Zealand February–May 1866.

America
She arrived in California in July 1866, and toured America, at first on the same bill as the Howson Family Troupe, but a dispute arose, details as yet not found, and Frank Howson, sen. (1818–1869) vowed he would never share a stage with her again.
Her last American engagement was at the Howard Athenaeum, Boston, in March 1868.

Britain
She returned to Great Britain, where her first engagement was with the Tyne Theatre, Newcastle on 13 April 1868, playing Josephine in The Daughter of the Regiment but lost her voice owing, she said, to a cold. Her efforts were, however, greeted by sympathetic cheers.

She was from June 1870 lessee of the Theatre Royal, Nottingham, with Clarence Holt as her stage manager, but had to quit after eight months due to declining health, and having lost a great deal of money. A meeting of her creditors in 1871 determined she had debts of some £1200–1300 and no assets apart from her wardrobe. She helped open the Gaiety Theatre, Edinburgh, but was not in good health, and finished her working life on the music hall stage. She died on 29 September 1875 from "rapid consumption".
She was a thoroughly conscientious actress, and neglected no means of making her characters representative. As a ballad-singer, in a certain line, she had no rival. She entered with all her soul into the spirit of what she had to do. She was an elegant, dashing, handsome woman, who could not be other than popular, and when she again left Australia, everybody hoped she would soon return again. For some time in England, her career was a tolerably prosperous one. She never had any position in London, but in the provinces she held her own very well. . . We remember her as the bright piquant comedienne to whom we are indebted for many a pleasant hour of enjoyment, and she will always be associated with some of our most agreeable memories of the Melbourne stage. . . When Sir William Don married her, it was regarded by his friends as a fatal mesalliance, but it turned out for him an excellent investment, looking at it only from a financial point of view, for although he was himself a very good actor, his profitable engagements were rendered much more certain in association with his wife.
Of her husband
The theatrical profession has lost in Sir William a most enthusiastic member. His admiration of his art was intense, and his success as an actor appeared to afford him more unalloyed satisfaction than his patrician descent, or his relationship to earls and duchesses. On no subject was his conversation more animated, and to nothing did his ambition point more steadfastly than to acquire distinction on the stage. Possessing a fine sense of humour, a quick perception of the ludicrous sides of life and character, a remarkable talent for mimicry, a strong nerve, a ready wit, and great self-possession, he was thus gifted with many qualifications essential to a good actor, and without arriving at any remarkable eminence as a comedian he was always amusing and frequently invested a character with quaint and fantastic attributes of his own devising.

Family
At some early date they had a daughter, Harriette Grace Mary Don, who married John Satterfield Sandars.

See also
List of entertainers who married titled Britishers

Notes and references 

1830 births
1875 deaths
19th-century English singers
19th-century English actresses
19th-century Australian women singers
19th-century Australian actresses